Tropidophis semicinctus, also known commonly as the banded dwarf boa, the yellow-banded dwarf boa, and the yellow-banded trope, is a species of snake in the family Tropidophiidae. The species is endemic to Cuba.

References

Tropidophiidae
Reptiles described in 1864
Snakes of the Caribbean
Reptiles of Cuba
Endemic fauna of Cuba